Purius is a genus of moths in the family Erebidae. The genus was erected by Francis Walker in 1855.

Species
Purius pilumnia (Stoll, [1780])
Purius superpulverea (Dyar, 1925)

References

Phaegopterina
Moth genera